"Meaning of Life" is a song by American recording artist Kelly Clarkson and the titular track from her eighth studio album of the same name. It was written by English singer James Morrison with Ilsey Juber and Jesse Shatkin, who handled its production. A soul pop and R&B song about learning the existential "meaning of life", the singer confesses the loneliness she's been feeling in the past but her newfound love is what brings her to life, showing her the light. Originally intended to be recorded for her 2015 studio album Piece by Piece, Clarkson put the song on hold and used it as a guiding track for other collaborators in developing a soulful sound for the succeeding album.

"Meaning of Life" was issued by Atlantic Records as a promotional single on October 19, 2017, a week before the album's release. An accompanying music video was released on May 14, 2018, in celebration of Mother's Day, and features Clarkson with her own children, which symbolizes her "meaning of life". To promote the album, Clarkson performed the track at the fifteenth series of the British program Strictly Come Dancing.

Composition and recording 

"Meaning of Life" was written by James Morrison with Ilsey Juber and Jesse Shatkin, who produced the track. A doo-wop soul pop and R&B song, it sings of learning the "meaning of life", during which the singer confesses the loneliness she's been feeling but her love is what brings her to life, showing her the light. Billboard editor Chris Malone noted that song can be about an estranged lover, with the singer yearns "for how things used to be, and how much better they made her feel". While Los Angeles Times music critic Michael Wood ascribed the song as reflective to Clarkson's family life. The track begins with a stripped down production and a despondent atmosphere as Clarkson "tends to a broken heart over punchy drums and an ominous bass line", with the singer injecting a more soulful performance as at each colossal chorus.

Morrison and Shatkin originally pitched the song for Clarkson's seventh studio album Piece by Piece in 2014, but Clarkson felt that the lyrical content of the track was unsuitable to the album's theme at the time. She later put a hold the composition and used it as a guiding point in recording the follow-up studio album, which she later named after the song, deeming that material represented from the rest of the tracks centers on the "meaning of life"—which to her means that "life is all about connection". Clarkson stated that the song "started this entire project", and that the vibe, soul, and message it was very critical in showing other writers and producers of the new soulful sound they were aiming to achieve to avoid pop-oriented material similar to her previous albums. As the first song selected for inclusion to the album, she remarked that it signaled a departure from previous records, and that it also acts as a statement about how she felt "right now". explaining that "There's something to loving your personal life and also your work life, and being able to choose who I work with after my American Idol contract finished. It feels like a new chapter."

Release and reception 
"Meaning of Life" was released on October 19, 2017, as a promotional single a week before the album's street date, accompanied by a live performance video filmed at the War Memorial Auditorium in Nashville, Tennessee, as part of the Meaning of Lifes "Nashville Sessions" promotional campaign. Clarkson has only performed the song in live television once at the fifteenth series of the British program Strictly Come Dancing on November 26, 2017. She had also performed it on the Billboard Women in Music event on November 30, 2017, after which she honored with the "Powerhouse Award".

Harper's Bazaars Erica Gonzales opined that the song "packs one soulful punch", and that Clarkson's "soulful, booming vocals take center stage" on it. Jon Blistein of Rolling Stone described the track as "euphoric" and its "Nashville Sessions" performance as a "striking one". In his review of the album for the Los Angeles Times, Wood meanwhile lamented that the song's lines are hardly taking advantage of Clarkson's newfound creative license and "could be sharper".

Music video 
A companion music video for the song premiered on May 13, 2018, in celebration of Mother's Day. Filmed by Sarah McColgan, it features Clarkson wandering in a dim-lit mansion. Midway towards the chorus, a golden light begins to cascade to its flower-filled halls which burst with a colorful atmosphere, where she is surrounded by a performing band. The video concludes with Clarkson accompanied by her children, which represent her "meaning of life". Country Livings Jessica Mattern noted that the video shows how her family with her husband has transformed her life. E! Online's Johnni Macke described it as a "cinematic dream" and wrote that "It's simple in some respects but dramatic in tone, location and wardrobe, which we love".

Personnel 
Credits lifted from the album's liner notes.

 Lead vocals – Kelly Clarkson
 Background vocals – Nicole Hurst, Bridget Sarai
 Drum programmer, drums, guitar, keyboards, synthesizer – Jesse Shatkin
 Mixing engineer – John Hanes
 Mastering engineers – Chris Gehringer, Will Quinnell
 Engineers – Jeff Chestek, Jesse Shatkin, Michael Harris
 Additional engineer – Samuel Dent
 Assistant engineers – Chris Cerullo*, Joel Metzler, Todd Tidwell
 Cello	– Glenn Fischbach, Jennie Lorenzo
 Conductor and string arranger – Larry Gold
 Production coordinator –  JoAnn Tominaga

 Horns – The Regiment Horns
 Mixer	– Serban Ghenea
 Organ – Buddy Ross
 Piano – Buddy Ross, Jesse Shatkin
 Producer, additional programmer – Jesse Shatkin
 Saxophone (Baritone, Tenor) – Leon Silva
 Trumpet, flugelhorn – Sean Erick
 Trombone, tuba – Kevin Williams Jr.
 Viola	– Davis Barnett, Jonathan Kim
 Violin – Charles Parker, Emma Kummrow, Gared Crawford, Henry Flory, Luigi Mazzocchi, Piotr Filochowski

Chart history

References 

2017 songs
American soul songs
Doo-wop songs
Kelly Clarkson songs
Atlantic Records singles
Song recordings produced by Jesse Shatkin
Songs written by Ilsey Juber
Songs written by James Morrison (singer)
Songs written by Jesse Shatkin